Serere District is a district in Eastern Uganda. It is named after its 'chief town', Serere, where the district headquarters are located.

Location

Serere District is bordered by Soroti District to the north, Ngora District to the east, Pallisa District, Kaliro District and Buyende District to the south. Kaberamaido District lies to the west of Serere District. The coordinates of the district are:01 30N, 33 33E.

Overview
Serere District was created by Act of Parliament and became functional effective 1 July 2010. Prior to that, it was part of Soroti District. Serere District is part of the Teso sub-region, home to an estimated 2.5 million people of Iteso and Kumam ethnicities. The districts that constitute the sub-region are: 1. Amuria District 2. Bukedea District 3. Kaberamaido District 4. Katakwi District 5. Kumi District 6. Ngora District 7. Serere District and 8. Soroti District. The sub-region is home to an estimated 2.5 million people of Iteso and Kumam ethnicities.

Population
In 1991 the national population census estimated the district population at about 90,400. The national census in 2002 estimated the population at about 176,500 (51% women), with an overwhelmingly rural population (80%), and a very high proportion of children (56%, or 46.5% if you consider only under 5-year-old children). In 2012, the population of Serere District was estimated at 294,100. The major ethnicities in the district are: Itesot, Kumam and Bukenye, Bantu peoples.

See also
 Serere
 Soroti District
 Teso sub-region
 Districts of Uganda

References

External links
  Serere District Website
  Serere Township Secondary School

 
Teso sub-region
Districts of Uganda
Eastern Region, Uganda